Mike Barr (born June 27, 1956) is an American former professional tennis player.

Barr grew up near Chicago in Highland Park, Illinois and played college tennis for the University of Wisconsin–Madison, from 1975 to 1978. He served as team captain in his senior year.

While competing on the professional tour he reached a career high singles ranking of 249 in the world. He featured in the men's doubles main draw at the 1980 French Open and singles main draw at the 1982 Australian Open. His best doubles ranking was 212 and he won three doubles titles on the ATP Challenger Tour.

Challenger titles

Doubles: (3)

References

External links
 
 

1956 births
Living people
American male tennis players
Tennis people from Illinois
People from Highland Park, Illinois
Wisconsin Badgers men's tennis players